Rape Scene is  a 2004 album by Thighpaulsandra.

Rape scene is a setting where a rape has taken place, either fictional or real.

Rape scene may also refer to:

 Untitled (Rape Scene), a 1973 work by Ana Mendieta